Kim Tae-gyun (Hangul: 김태균; born August 19, 1971) is a former South Korean baseball player.

Not known for his batting, Kim was an excellent utility infielder and was a key component to the defensive formula of the Samsung Lions in the late-1990s. He was part of the South Korean national baseball team which won the bronze medal at the 2000 Summer Olympics. In the middle of the 2002 season, Kim was traded to the Lotte Giants. After a career year in 2004 Kim was signed as a free agent by the SK Wyverns and played there until 2007 when he announced retirement.

Kim served as the infield instructor of the SK Wyverns reserve team.

References

External links 
 
 Kim Tae Gyun at Korea Baseball Organization
 
 
 
 

Lotte Giants coaches
Samsung Lions coaches
SSG Landers coaches
1971 births
Living people
South Korean baseball players
Samsung Lions players
Lotte Giants players
SSG Landers players
Baseball players at the 2000 Summer Olympics
Olympic baseball players of South Korea
Olympic bronze medalists for South Korea
Olympic medalists in baseball
Chung-Ang University alumni
Busan High School alumni
South Korean baseball coaches
Sportspeople from Busan
Medalists at the 2000 Summer Olympics
South Korean Buddhists